Manuel Acero Montoro (1875 – 4 November 1939) was a politician of the Second Spanish Republic. He was from Baeza. After the Nationalist victory in the Spanish Civil War, he was executed by the Francoist State.

References

1875 births
1939 deaths
Alcaldes of the Second Spanish Republic
People executed by Francoist Spain
People from Baeza